HD 180450 is a single star in the northern constellation of Lyra, positioned about half a degree to the NNW of the globular cluster M56. At an apparent visual magnitude of 5.88, it is dimly visible to the naked eye under good viewing conditions. This star is located at a distance of approximately 1,400 light years from the Sun based on parallax measurements, but is drifting closer with a radial velocity of −64.4 km/s.

This is an aging red giant star with a stellar classification of M1IIIab, It is currently on the asymptotic giant branch, having exhausted the supply of hydrogen in its core and evolved of the main sequence. It has expanded to ~68 times the radius of the Sun and is radiating a thousand times the Sun' luminosity from its enlarged photosphere at en effective temperature  of 3,947 K.

References

M-type giants
Lyra (constellation)
Durchmusterung objects
180450
094630
7302